Richard Charles Lerblance (born March 9, 1946) is an American politician who previously served in the Oklahoma Senate from the 7th district, which includes Haskell, Latimer, Pittsburg and Sequoyah counties, after winning a special election to fill the vacancy created by the resignation of Gene Stipe in June 2003 serving until 2012. He earlier was a member of the Oklahoma House of Representatives from 2002 through 2003.

External links
Senator Richard Lerblance - District 7 official State Senate website
Project Vote Smart - Richard Lerblance (OK) profile
Follow the Money -
2008 2006 2004 State Senate campaign contributions
2002 State House campaign contributions

1946 births
Living people
People from Hartshorne, Oklahoma
Democratic Party Oklahoma state senators
Democratic Party members of the Oklahoma House of Representatives
Muscogee (Creek) Nation state legislators in Oklahoma
University of Central Oklahoma alumni
Politicians from Oklahoma City
Lawyers from Oklahoma City
21st-century American politicians
21st-century Native American politicians